Thomas William Schuman  (born January 31, 1958) is an American jazz pianist, smooth jazz keyboardist, the co-leader, composer and arranger. of 13 Grammy nominated contemporary jazz group, Spyro Gyra.  He has been the keyboardist for Spyro Gyra since he was 16 years old (before the release of their first album). He has performed on all of Spyro Gyra's albums to date and has written or co-written over sixty Spyro Gyra compositions since the album Catching the Sun (MCA, 1980).

Tom also produced 6 solo albums on his own label http://jazzbridge.com.   He also built and engineers his own recording studio https://schuboxstudios.com.

Discography
Solo
 Extremities (GRP, 1990)
 Schuman Nature (JazzBridge, 2003)
 Into Your Heart (JazzBridge, 2002)
 Deep Chill (JazzBridge, 2006)
 Reflections Over Time (JazzBridge, 2010)
 Designated Planets (JazzBridge, 2013)
 Live At Marians Jazzroom (JazzBridge, 2018)

With Spyro Gyra
 Spyro Gyra (Amherst Records, 1978)
 Morning Dance (MCA, 1979)
 Catching The Sun (MCA, 1980)
 Carnaval (MCA, 1980)
 Freetime (MCA, 1981)
 Incognito (MCA, 1982)
 City Kids (MCA, 1983)
 Access All Areas (MCA, 1984)
 Alternating Currents (MCA, 1985)
 Breakout (MCA, 1986)
 Stories Without Words (MCA, 1987)
 Rights Of Summer (GRP, 1988)
 Point Of View (GRP, 1989)
 Fast Forward (GRP, 1990)
 Three Wishes (GRP, 1992)
 Dreams Beyond Control (GRP, 1993)
 Love And Other Obsessions (GRP, 1995)
 Heart Of The Night (GRP, 1996)
 20/20 (GRP, 1997)
 Road Scholars (GRP, 1997)
 Got The Magic (Windham Hill, 1999)
 In Modern Times (Heads Up, 2001)
 Original Cinema (Heads Up, 2003)
 The Deep End (Heads Up, 2004)
 Wrapped In A Dream (Heads Up, 2006)
 Good To Go Go (Heads Up, 2007)
 A Night Before Christmas (Heads Up, 2008)
 Down The Wire (Heads Up, 2009)
 A Foreign Affair (Amherst, 2011)
 The Rhinebeck Sessions (Crosseyed Bear, 2013)
 Vinyl Tap (Amherst, 2019)
 
 

With Gamalon
 Gamalon (1987) 
 High Contrast (1991)

With Jason Miles
 Celebrating the Music of Weather Report (2000)
 To Grover, With Love (2002)

With Steve Oliver
 Positive Energy (2002)
 3D (2004)
 Radiant (2006)

With others
 On the Way, Justin Young (2007)
 Heart Song, Al Williams (2008)
 Let It Ride, Jeff Kashiwa (2012)

 In a Temple Garden,  Yusef Lateef (1979)
 Breath Of Life,  Birthright (1976)
 Who Is Blair, Barney Perry (1978)

References

1958 births
Living people
Musicians from Buffalo, New York
Jazz musicians from New York (state)
21st-century American keyboardists
Spyro Gyra members